John Savage (born John Smeallie Youngs; August 25, 1949) is an American actor best known for his roles in the films The Deer Hunter (1978), The Onion Field (1979), Hair (1979) and Salvador (1986). He is also known for his role as Donald Lydecker in the TV series Dark Angel.

Career
Savage has appeared in more than 200 feature films, short films, recurring roles in television series and guest appearances in episodes of television series. One of Savage's first notable roles is as Claude Bukowski in the 1979 film Hair. His first major film role was as Steven Pushkov in the multiple Oscar-winning 1978 film The Deer Hunter. He also had a lead role in the 1979 film The Onion Field.

In the late 1970s, he performed in the Broadway production of David Mamet's play American Buffalo.

In 1991, he starred in Italian director Lucio Fulci's final film Door to Silence. He then had a brief role in the 1998 war film The Thin Red Line, portrayed Captain Ransom in the two part episode "Equinox" of the television series Star Trek: Voyager in 1999, and appeared in the recurring role of Donald Lydecker in the first and second seasons of the 2000 television series Dark Angel.

Savage appeared in the recurring role of Henry Scudder in the HBO television series Carnivàle between 2003 and 2005. He appeared in unrelated roles in two of the series in the Law & Order franchise: the 2004 Law & Order: Criminal Intent episode "Conscience" as a man who put his wife in a permanent coma, and the 2005 Law & Order: Special Victims Unit episode "Quarry" as a child molester on death row for murdering one of his victims.

Savage appeared in the 2015 horror film Tales of Halloween, the 2017 film In Dubious Battle, and on the 2017 continuation of the television show Twin Peaks.

In 2017, Savage spoke at a tribute honoring director Richard Donner, held by The Academy of Motion Picture Arts and Sciences.
 
In 2018, he appeared on the television show Goliath. In the same year, Savage lent his voice to a monologue on the title track of the album This Town by Steve Smith of Dirty Vegas.

In 2019 Savage played the role of The Narrator in fantasy crime drama Karma from award-winning filmmaker Bizhan Tong, having collaborated with him earlier that year. They would once again collaborate on the international pandemic thriller Lockdown.

Filmography

 The Master Beater (1969) as Rocco
 Love Is a Carousel (1971) as Boy Friend
 Bad Company (1972) as Loney
 Steelyard Blues (1973) as Kid
 The Killing Kind (1973) as Terry Lambert
 All the Kind Strangers (1974) as Peter
 The Sister-in-Law (1974) as Robert Strong
 Eric (1975) as Eric Swensen
 John O'Hara's Gibbsville (1975, TV Movie) as Jim Malloy
 Gibbsville (1976, TV Series) as Jim Malloy
 The Deer Hunter (1978) as Steven Pushkov
 Hair (1979) as Claude Hooper Bukowski
 The Onion Field (1979) as Det. Karl Francis Hettinger
 Inside Moves (1980) as Roary
 Cattle Annie and Little Britches (1981) as Bittercreek Newcomb
 The Amateur (1981) as Charles Heller
 Coming Out of the Ice (1982) as Victor Herman
 Brady's Escape (1983) as J.W. Brady
 Maria's Lovers (1984) as Ivan Bibic
 Silent Witness (1984) as Kevin Dunne
 Vengeance of a Soldier (1986) as Frank Morgan
 Salvador (1986) as John Cassady
 The Little Sister (1986) as Tim Donovan
 Hotel Colonial (1987) as Marco Venieri
 Beauty and the Beast (1987) as Beast / Prince
 Caribe (1987) as Jeff Richardson
 The Beat (1988) as Frank Ellsworth
 Point of View (1989) 
 Do the Right Thing (1989) as Clifton
 Any Man's Death (1990) as Leon Abrahams
 Voice in the Dark (1990) as Dan Montgomery
 The Godfather Part III (1990) as Father Andrew Hagen
 Ottobre rosa all'Arbat (1990) as Boris
 Dark Tale (1991) as Roy Kramer
 Hunting (1991) as Michael Bergman
 Mountain of Diamonds (1991) as Blaine
 Door to Silence (1991) as Melvin Devereux
 Buck ai confini del cielo (1991) as Wintrop
 Primary Motive (1992) as Wallace Roberts
 Flynn (1993) as Joe Stromberg
 Daybreak (1993) as President
 Berlin '39 (1993) as Wieland
 CIA II: Target Alexa (1993) as Franz Kluge
 Killing Obsession (1994) as Albert
 Red Scorpion 2 (1994) as Andrew Kendrick
 Deadly Weapon (1994) as Sanders
 Tales from the Crypt' (1994) [(early made-for-cable series) T.V. episode) as Benny [episode "Revenge is the Nuts" (Season 6, Episode 5)]
 The Dangerous (1995) as Emile Lautrec
 Carnosaur 2 (1995) as Jack Reed
 OP Center (1995) as Bob Herbert
 Død Kalm (The X-Files) (1995) (TV episode) as Henry Trondheim
 The Conversion (The Outer Limits) (1995) as Lucas
 The Crossing Guard (1995) as Bobby
 The Takeover (1995) as Greg
 Fatal Choice (1995) as Drury
 White Squall (1996) as McCrea
 One Good Turn (1996) as Santapietro
 Where Truth Lies (1996) as Dr. Ian Lazarre
 American Strays (1996) as Dwayne
 Walker Texas Ranger (1996) as Sergeant Major Tom Hawkins
 The Mouse (1996) as Bruce 'The Mouse' Strauss
 Little Boy Blue (1997) as Ray West
 Firestorm (1997) as Brinkman
 Amnesia (1997) as Tim Bishop
 Hollywood Safari (1997) as Deputy Rogers
 Hostile Intent (1997) as Bear
 Et hjørne af Paradis (1997) as Padre Louis
 Managua (1997) as Dennis
 Before Women Had Wings (1997) as Billy Jackson
 Ultimo taglio (1997) as Leo
 Notti di paura (1997) as Paola
 Club Vampire (1998) as Zero
 Lost Souls (1998) as Victor Robinson
 The Thin Red Line (1998) as Sgt. McCron
 Centurion Force (1998)
 Frontline (1999) as Captain Wolfgang Mueller
 Message in a Bottle (1999) as Johnny Land
 The Jack Bull (1999) as Slater
 Summer of Sam (1999) as Simon
 Equinox (Star Trek: Voyager) (1999) (TV - 2-part episode) as Captain Rudy Ransom
 Ghost Soldier (1999)
 The Virginian (2000) as Steve
 Christina's House (2000) as James Tarling
 They Nest (2000) as Jack Wald
 Dead Man's Run (2001) as Carver
 Burning Down the House (2001) as Jake Seiling
 Dark Angel (2000–2001, TV Series) as Donald Lydecker
 Redemption of the Ghost (2002) as Sheriff Rollie Burns
 The Anarchist Cookbook (2002) as Johnny Red
 Intoxicating (2003) as William Shanley
 Easy Sex (2003) as Frank Iverson
 Carnivàle (2003–2005, TV Series) as Henry 'Hack' Scudder
 Law and Order: Criminal Intent (2004, TV Series) as Mark Farrell
 Alien Lockdown (2004) as Dr. Woodman
 Fallacy (2004) as Heathcliff
 Sucker Free City (2004) as Anderson Wade
 Admissions (2004) as Harry Brighton
 Downtown: A Street Tale (2004) as H2O
 Iowa (2005) as Irv Huffman
 Confessions of a Pit Fighter (2005) as McGee
 Love's Long Journey (2005) as Trent
 The New World (2005) as Savage
 Fringe (TV) Night of Desirable Objects (2009) as Andre Hughes
 Kill Your Darlings (2006) as Rock
 The Drop (2006) as Mr. Zero
 Shut Up and Shoot! (2006) as Marty Pearlheimer
 Shortcut to Happiness (2007) as Johnny (uncredited)
 The Attic (2007) as Graham Callan
 The Grift (2008) as William Bender
 From a Place of Darkness (2008) as Vic
 Boiler Maker (2008) as JJ
 The Coverup (2008) as Thomas Thacker
 The Golden Boys (2008) as Web Saunders
 The Violent Kind (2008) as George Malloy
 Anytown (2009) as News Producer
 Handsome Harry (2009) as Peter Rheems
 Qi chuan xu xu (2009) as Frank Dreibelbis
 Buffalo Bushido (2009) as Vendetti
 Remembering Nigel (2009) as Himself
 The Red Canvas (2009)
 Dreamkiller (2010) as Agent Barnes
 Bereavement (2010) as Ted
 A Small Town Called Descent (2010) as Father Scully
 Bed & Breakfast (2010) as Mr. Harvey
 The Right to Bear Arms (2010) as Brutal Magnus
 Colombian Interviews (2011) as James
 The Last Gamble (2011) as John
 Nichirin no isan (2011) as Douglas MacArthur
 The Orphan Killer (2011) as Detective Walker
 Hit List (2011) as Walter Murphy
 Assassins' Code (2011) as Arlo
 Sweetwater (2012) as Calvin Kabral
 The Black Dove (2012) as Jake Williams
 Sins Expiation (2012) as Father Karl
 Art Of Submission (2012) as Harbin Rask
 Open Road (2013) as Carl
 The Sorrow Man (2013) as Father Bill
 Real Gangsters (2013) as Ted Roberts
 Gemini Rising (2013) as Manning
 Awakened (2013) as Jack Winston
 A Star for Rose (2013) as Mort
 Defending Santa (2013) as Judge Willis
 7E (2013) as Paul
 Discarded (2013) as Jay
 Bullet (2014) as Governor Johnson
 Bermuda Tentacles (2014) as President DeSteno
 Fort Bliss (2014) as Mike Swann
 See How They Run (2014) as The Codger
 The Lookalike (2014) as William Spinks
 Cry of the Butterfly (2014) as William Berman
 Cleaners (2014, TV Series) as Marcus Walker
 The Big Fat Stone (2014) as Robert Tanninger
 Nephilim (2014) as Father Samuel (voice)
 The Sparrows: Nesting (2015) as Marvin
 We Will Be the World Champions (2015) as William Jones
 Tales of Halloween (2015) as Capt. J.G. Zimmerman (segment "Bad Seed")
 Beverly Hills Christmas (2015) as Mr. Winters
 Sensory Perception (2015) as President of United Earth
 Last Call at Murray's (2016) as Bennett
 Teen Star Academy (2016) as Burt
 Texas Heart (2016) as Carl
 In Dubious Battle (2016) as Dan
 American Romance (2016) as Emery Reed
 Everglades (2016)
 Dead South (2016) as Stokes
 Gates of Darkness (2017) as Joseph
 Povratak (2017) as Covek u crnom odelu
 Impuratus (2017) as Heysinger
 Twin Peaks (2017, TV series) as Detective Clark
 The Neighborhood (2017) as Vito Bello
 Torch (2017) as August Lewin
 Spreading Darkness (2017) as Brett
 Fake News (2017) as President Wayne Walker
 Going Vertical (2017) as Hank Aiba
 Untitled Livi Zheng Project (2017) as Frank
 Hold On (2017) as Dr. Siedhoff
 Empire of the Sharks (2017) as Ian Fien
 The Dog of Christmas (2018) as Ron
 Down's Revenge (2018) as Dr. Sorkin
 Betrayed (2018) as Mayor Alderman
 40 and Single (2018) as Stewart Temple
 Mission Possible (2018) as Captain Ted
 American Exit (2018) as Actor
 Heavenly Deposit (2018) as Donald
 The Islands (2018) as Henry Thornton
 War Photographer (2018) as Epifano
 Goliath (2018, TV series) as Mickey
 Torque (2018, TV series) as Agent Curtis
 A Medicine for the Mind (2018, Short Film) as Martin
 Easy Way Out (2018, Short Film, Executive Producer) as Dr. Ernest Brown
 6 Children & 1 Grandfather (2018)
 Followed (2019) as Wallace Fleischer
 The Last Full Measure (2019) as Kepper
 Spinning Dry as Frank Manghetti
 Ovid and the Art of Love as Augustus
 Karma (2020) as The Narrator
 Insight (2021) as Frank
 Lockdown'' (2021) as The Narrator

References

External links

Living people
Male actors from New York (state)
American male film actors
American male television actors
People from Old Bethpage, New York
20th-century American male actors
21st-century American male actors
1949 births